Martin Gerald Rosen (born August 31, 1936) is an American filmmaker and theater producer. He directed the animated film adaptations of Watership Down (1978) and The Plague Dogs (1982), both from the Richard Adams novels.

Career
Rosen originally worked as a literary agent before he moved with his wife to the United Kingdom.

He first produced the Canadian feature A Great Big Thing (1968) and later co-produced Ken Russell's film version of Women in Love (1969), which won Academy Awards for Glenda Jackson and Billy Williams (cinematographer)

Rosen was originally the producer of Watership Down but took over as director after John Hubley, the original director, left after disagreements with Rosen. He also wrote the screenplay for it. This was the first of two novels by Richard Adams he adapted. In 1982 he also produced, directed and wrote the screenplay for another animated feature based on an Adams novel, The Plague Dogs (1982). Rosen produced  Smooth Talk (1986), which won the Sundance Grand Prize.  His last film as director was Stacking (1987). His last project as producer was the animated [[Watership Down (TV series)|Watership Down]] TV series in 1999.

Rosen has also worked in theater production. He was the originating producer of Michael Weller's Moonchildren, first presented at London's Royal Court Theater before transferring to the US. He was the originating producer of Maxine Hong Kingston's "The Woman Warrior", presented in association with The Berkeley Rep, Boston's Huntington Theater, and the Doolittle Theater in Los Angeles.

Watership Down ownership controversy
On 27 May 2020, the Intellectual Property Enterprise Court in London ruled that Rosen had wrongly claimed all rights to the book Watership Down, and terminated the contract which had given him rights to the film. He had entered into adaptation contracts worth more than $500,000 (£400,000), including licenses for an audiobook adaptation and the 2018 television adaptation.

In his ruling, Judge Richard Hacon ordered Rosen to pay over $100,000 in damages for copyright infringement, unauthorised license deals, and denying royalty payments to the Adams estate. He was also directed to provide a record of all license agreements involving Watership Down and pay court costs and the Adams estate's legal fees totalling £28,000. Subsequent failure to comply with the terms of the UK judgement left Rosen in contempt of court and facing enforcement proceedings in Connecticut.

Personal life
Rosen is married to Elisabeth Payne Rosen, an author and ordained deacon in the Episcopal Church. They reside in Ross, California.

Credits
Films

Television

Theater
 I, Frederick The Women Warrior China Men Hallam's War''

Critical reception

Awards and nominations

References

External links
 
 Nepenthe Productions

American film directors
American film producers
American male screenwriters
American television producers
American theatre managers and producers
British animated film directors
British animated film producers
British film directors
British film producers
British television producers
British theatre managers and producers
Living people
1936 births